Saint Kitts and Nevis competed in the 2010 Summer Youth Olympics which were held in Singapore from August 14 to August 26, 2010.

Athletics

Note: The athletes who do not have a "Q" next to their Qualification Rank advance to a non-medal ranking final.

Boys
Track and Road Events

Girls
Track and Road Events

References

External links
Competitors List: Saint Kitts and Nevis

2010 in Saint Kitts and Nevis
Nations at the 2010 Summer Youth Olympics
2010